The University of Zadar is a university located in Zadar, Croatia. The university in its present form was founded in 2002, but can trace its lineage to 1396, thus making it the oldest tertiary institution in Croatia and one of the oldest in Europe.

History 
The university was originally founded by the Dominicans in 1396 as Universitas Iadertina, a theological seminary, Iadera being the Latin name for Zadar. It was a continuation of the University of Dyrrachium, in Durrës (Dyrrhachium), Venice, then Republic of Venice, which had been created around 1380, and then transferred to Zadar in 1396, amid the mounting Turkish threats in Southeastern Europe, thereby becoming the University of Zadar.

Consequently, it became the first institute of higher learning in the country. In 1807, it ceased being an independent institution and its functions were taken over by other local universities. In 1956, the University of Zagreb reconstituted it as a satellite campus for the Faculty of Philosophy division. The faculty later became part of the University of Split. Finally, in 2002, more than six centuries after the university's initial founding, the Croatian Parliament passed an act to allow for its full-fledged refounding. Now independent, the renewed University of Zadar opened its doors to students in January 2003.

Since its reestablishment, the university has continued to grow. It had implemented the Bologna Process for the academic year of 2005-2006 as part of nationwide reform. A follow-up study showed that the move was beneficial and had improved its profile internationally. This allowed it to engage in collaborative research agreements and student exchange programmes with other reputable universities around the continent. It also has agreements with universities in South America and the United States. 

The first Croatian president, Franjo Tuđman, graduated from the University of Zadar in 1965, then part of the University of Zagreb.

Faculties 

Today, the University of Zadar includes 27 university departments:

 Department of Archaeology
 Department of Classical Philology
 Division of Greek Language and Literature
 Division of Latin Language and Literature
 Department of Croatian Studies
 Department of Ecology, Agronomy and Aquaculture
 Department of Economics
 Department of English Studies
 Department of Ethnology and Anthropology
 Department of French and Francophone Studies
 Department of Geography
 Department of German Studies
 Department of Health Studies
 Department of Hispanic and Iberian Studies
 Department of History
 Department of History of Art
 Department of Information Sciences 
 Department of Italian Studies 
 Department of Linguistics
 Department of Pedagogy
 Department of Philosophy
 Department of Psychology
 Department of Religious Sciences
 Department of Russian Studies
 Department of Sociology
 Department of Teacher Education Studies in Gospić
 Department of Teachers and Preschool Teachers Education
 Division of Elementary School Teacher Education
 Division of Preschool Teacher Education
  Department of Tourism and Communication Studies
 Maritime department 
 Division of Nautical Studies
 Division of Maritime Engineering

In order to organise and promote scientific research activities, the university has founded four research centres as its constituent units. These include the Centre for Adriatic Onomastic Research, the Stjepan Matičević Centre, the Centre for Karst and Coastal Research, and the Centre for Interdisciplinary Marine and Maritime Research - CIMMAR.

In addition, there are two active centres for professional and teaching activities: the Centre for Gymnastics and Student Sport, and the Centre for Foreign Languages.

See also
 List of universities in Croatia

References

External links 
 University of Zadar Website 
 Info Zadar 

 
Educational institutions established in the 14th century
Universities and colleges in Croatia
1396 establishments in Europe